Middle Claydon is a village and civil parish in the Aylesbury Vale district of Buckinghamshire, England.

The toponym "Claydon" is derived from the Old English for "clay hill". The affix "Middle" differentiates the village from nearby Steeple Claydon, and East Claydon, and from the hamlet of Botolph Claydon. The Domesday Book of 1086 records the Claydon area as Claindone.

The Church of England parish church of All Saints is in the grounds of Claydon House, a National Trust property. The house was the home of Sir Edmund Verney, an English Civil War Royalist,  and of Florence Nightingale.

References

Further reading

External links

Civil parishes in Buckinghamshire
Verney family
Villages in Buckinghamshire